Kolymskoye is a rural locality (a selo) in the Srednekansky District of Magadan Oblast, Russia. As of the 2010 Census, its population was 27.

References

Notes

Rural localities in Magadan Oblast